Talib Johri (27 August 1929  – 21 June 2020) was a Pakistani Islamic scholar, poet, historian and philosopher of the Shia Sect of Islam. He is widely renowned as the most prominent Shia scholar, and his sermons were broadcast on PTV Network.

Career 
 He was a promoter of Shia Sunni unity in Pakistan.

Education 

Allama Talib Jauhari also studied under Sayyid Abu al-Qasim al-Khoei. He was a student of Muhammad Baqir al-Sadr. He has been a class fellow of Sayyid Ali Sistani, although Sistani was among his seniors. Zeeshan Haider Jawwadi was also one of his class fellows in Najaf."

Books 
Talib Jauhari wrote Hadees e Karabala and several books, including a detailed commentary on the Quran. His book Alamaat e Zahoor e Mehdi is considered as one of the most comprehensive books compiled and written on the topic of Imam Mehdi in Urdu language. He was also a poet, and three compilations of his poetry were published during his lifetime. The following is a list of his known works:

Tafseer-e-Quran: 
 Ahsan al Hadees (Qur'anic exegesis)

Maqtal: 
 Hadees e Karabala

Religion: 
 Zikray Masoom
 Nizaam Hayat-e-Insani
 Khulafaey Isna A'shr
 Alamatay Zahooray Mehdi

Philosophy: 
 Aqliyat-e-Ma'asir (2005)

Poetry: 
 Harf-e-Namoo (Urdu poetry)
 Pas-e-Afaq (Urdu poetry)
 Shakh e Sada (Urdu poetry)

Recognition and awards 
The Government of Pakistan awarded him the Sitara-i-Imtiaz for his contribution in the field of religious activities.

Death and legacy 

The 91-year-old Johri was admitted to a private hospital on 10 June. He is said to have developed cardiovascular complications and was on ventilator since then, he died on 22 June. However Chief Minister Sindh Murad Ali Shah revealed in a speech at Sindh Assembly that Talib Jauhri, Munawar Hasan and Mufti Naeem, all of the three clerics who died  in past week were due to COVID-19 during the COVID-19 pandemic in Pakistan.

He was survived by three sons and three daughters. Prime Minister of Pakistan Imran Khan, President Arif Alvi, Army Chief Qamar Javed Bajwa expressed sadness over his death. Earlier in 2014 his son-in-law Syed Mubarak Raza Kazmi was killed in 'sectarian' attack  in Karachi 13/B, Gulshan-e-Iqbal.

See also 
 Muhammad Mustafa Jauhar

References

External links
 "Khursheed-e-Khawar" by Hujjat-ul-Islam Maulana Saeed Akhtar from India (A book on biography of the Shia scholars of South Asia)
 Fehm-ul-Quran series by Allama Talib Jauhari on PTV 
 Allama Talib Jauhari Books
 Allama Talib Jauhari Online Books
 Allama Talib Jauhri Speeches (Majaalis) 
 Ahsan-al-hadees by Allama Talib Jauhari
 Allama Talib Jauhari Lectures/Majalis 
 Unity and justice of God Book by Maulana Muhammad Mustafa Jauhar
 'Truth Wisdom and Justice behind Oneness of Allah' by Maulana Jauhar
 Maulana Mushammad Mustafa Jauhar Lectures
 Allama Amjad Jauhari Majalis
 Assassination attempt on Allama Talib Jauhari

20th-century Muslim scholars of Islam
Islamic philosophers
Pakistani scholars
Pakistani philosophers
Urdu-language poets from Pakistan
Pakistani people of Bihari descent
Pakistani Shia Muslims
1929 births
2020 deaths
Writers from Patna
Recipients of Sitara-i-Imtiaz
Deaths from the COVID-19 pandemic in Sindh